The England Lions cricket team toured Australia from 7 February 2013 to 1 March 2013. The tour consisted of three tour matches against Victoria and five unofficial One Day Internationals (ODIs) against Australia A. Victoria won the tour matches 3-0 while Australia A defeated the England Lions 4–0.

Squads

 *On 24 January Clarke, Meaker and Overton replaced Root and Harris, with Taylor taking the captaincy from Root.
 **On 25 January Briggs was ruled out of the tour by a sprained ankle.

Tour matches

50 over match : Victoria v England Lions

50 over match : Victorian XI v England Lions

50 over match : Victoria v England Lions

Unofficial ODI series

1st unofficial ODI

2nd unofficial ODI

3rd unofficial ODI

4th unofficial ODI

5th unofficial ODI

References

External links
 Series home at ESPN Cricinfo

2012–13 Australian cricket season
English cricket tours of Australia